Las Colinas Urban Center station is a DART Light Rail station in the Las Colinas development of Irving, Texas. A connection with the Las Colinas APT serves the businesses and residents of the Las Colinas Urban Center.

The station was temporarily used as a replacement for the North Irving Transit Center until the opening of the second phase of the Orange Line when bus routes were then split between the North Irving Transit Center, Irving Convention Center station, and North Lake College station.

References

External links 
Dallas Area Rapid Transit - Las Colinas Urban Center Station
DART Expansion Plans

Dallas Area Rapid Transit light rail stations
Railway stations in the United States opened in 2012
Railway stations in Dallas County, Texas
Transportation in Irving, Texas